Joeri de Kamps (born 10 February 1992) is a Dutch professional footballer who plays as a defensive midfielder for Polish Ekstraklasa club Lechia Gdańsk.

Career

Ajax
De Kamps was born in Amsterdam, where he joined the youth ranks of his local neighborhood clubs JOS Watergraafsmeer and SV Diemen as a child. From here he was recruited into the Ajax Academy in 2000. Working his way up the echelons of the club, he signed his first professional contract with Ajax in April 2011, signing a two-year contract with Ajax running until the Summer of 2013.

On 22 October 2011, he received his first call up for the first team alongside his teammate Dico Koppers, ahead of the Klassieker match against arch-rivals Feyenoord in the 2011–12 Eredivisie season. Appearing on head coach Frank de Boer's 18-men selection for the fixture due to Ajax first choice defensive midfielder Eyong Enoh being sidelined with an injury. This resulted in Vurnon Anita moving over form the starting left back position to take his place, and Dico Koppers filling in as left back. De Kamps however sat on the bench for the entire match which ended a 1–1 draw in Amsterdam, thus postponing the players first team debut.

Still playing in the Beloften Eredivisie for the reserves team Jong Ajax during the 2012–13 campaign, de Kamps was given the number 42 shirt and was on Frank de Boer's list of registered players for the 2012–13 UEFA Champions League campaign, practicing with the first team in De Lutte during trainingscamp, and playing alongside them in friendly encounters during the pre-season.

On 5 March 2013, de Kamps extended his contract with Ajax which was on the verge of expiration, signing a three-year deal this time, binding him to Ajax until the Summer of 2016. After the promotion of the reserves team Jong Ajax to the Eerste Divisie ahead of the 2013-14 season, de Kamps finally made his professional debut on 5 August 2013 against SC Telstar in the season opener at the Amsterdam Arena which ended as a 2–0 victory for the Amsterdam side.

Heerenveen (loan)
On 1 September 2013, it was announced in De Telegraaf, that de Kamps would join his teammate Mitchell Dijks for a season long loan spell with SC Heerenveen lasting until 30 June 2014. De Kamps, made a total of 13 appearances for the Frisian club, under manager Marco van Basten during the 2013–14 Eredivisie season.

NAC Breda
On 6 May 2014, it was announced that de Kamps would transfer to NAC Breda as a free transfer, due to the expiration of his contract in Amsterdam. De Kamps signed a three-year contract with the club from Breda. De Kamps made his official debut for NAC on 9 August 2014, during the first matchday of the Eredivisie, in a home game against Excelsior that ended in 1–1. He was in the starting eleven and was replaced by Joey Suk in the 83rd minute. De Kamps scored on 23 September 2014 in the KNVB Cup match against Spakenburg, which was won 4–3. He was responsible for scoring the 2–1 in the 43rd minute. De Kamps received his twelfth yellow card of the season on 25 April 2015, in the match against Heracles Almelo. In doing so, he equaled Guy Ramos' Eredivisie record from the 2011–12 season. With NAC, he relegated from the Eredivisie after the 2014–15 season. After the relegation, De Kamps barely received playing time during the first half of the season, partly due to a persistent tendon injury. This gave him the opportunity to look for another club from NAC.

Slovan Bratislava
At the beginning of January 2016, De Kamps moved to Slovakian club Slovan Bratislava, where he signed a three-and-a-half-year contract. He made his debut for the club on 27 February 2016, away against league leaders AS Trenčín (2–0 away win). De Kamps was in the starting lineup and was replaced by Granwald Scott after more than an hour of play. He finished the year with Slovan Bratislava in second place in the Slovak Super Liga. De Kamps was the only Dutchman at the club at that time, but this changed in the run-up to the next season, as they signed Lorenzo Burnet, Lesly de Sa, Ruben Ligeon and Mitchell Schet in May and June 2016.

Loan to Sparta Rotterdam
On 20 January 2022, de Kamps joined Sparta Rotterdam in Eredivisie on loan with an option to buy.

Lechia Gdańsk
On 30 August 2022, Polish side Lechia Gdańsk announced the signing of de Kamps on a two-year contract with an extension option.

International career
De Kamps received his first call up for the Dutch national team, when Cor Pot called him up for the Netherlands U-21 squad on 29 February 2012, when he appeared in a friendly encounter against Denmark U-21, ending in a 3−0 victory at home for Jong Oranje.

Career statistics

Club

1 Includes UEFA Champions League and UEFA Europa League matches.

2 Includes Johan Cruijff Shield and Play-off matches.

Honours
Slovan Bratislava
Fortuna Liga: 2018–19, 2019–20, 2020–21
Slovnaft Cup: 2016–17, 2017–18, 2019–20, 2020–21

References

External links
 Voetbal International profile 
 Netherlands U21 stats at OnsOranje

1992 births
Living people
Association football midfielders
Footballers from Amsterdam
Dutch footballers
Netherlands under-21 international footballers
AFC Ajax players
Jong Ajax players
SC Heerenveen players
NAC Breda players
ŠK Slovan Bratislava players
Sparta Rotterdam players
Lechia Gdańsk players
Eredivisie players
Eerste Divisie players
Slovak Super Liga players
Ekstraklasa players
Dutch expatriate footballers
Dutch expatriate sportspeople in Slovakia
Expatriate footballers in Slovakia
Dutch expatriate sportspeople in Poland
Expatriate footballers in Poland